State Focus was an Australian magazine program that was broadcast on Southern Cross Ten between 2004 and January 2009, presented by Peta Burton in the Southern NSW market and in Canberra, Judi Hogan in the regional Queensland market, and a unknown presenter in the regional Victoria and Northern NSW markets. Separate editions were made for Canberra,  Southern NSW, Northern NSW, Queensland and Victoria. The show featured interviews of people across regional Australia.

References

Australian television talk shows
Australian non-fiction television series
Southern Cross Ten original programming
English-language television shows